The Coalition for Gora (KzG) was a Gorani political party in Kosovo led by Adem Hodža.

History
In the 2014 parliamentary elections the party received 0.16% of the vote, winning the seat reserved for Gorani.

References

Political parties of minorities in Kosovo
Gorani people